Bethel Cemetery is a cemetery in rural western Lawrence County, Arkansas. Its oldest portion occupies a roughly triangular parcel of land, surrounded by a perimeter road, with a gate at the eastern corner. It is located next to the site of a church which was established in the 1820s, and its oldest grave is supposedly the 1835 burial of an American Revolutionary War veteran. The oldest dated grave marker is marked 1858, and the cemetery continues to be used today. The cemetery is a reminder of the community of Denton, which flourished in the mid-19th century, but declined after it was bypassed by the railroad.

The cemetery was listed on the National Register of Historic Places in 1999.

See also
 National Register of Historic Places listings in Lawrence County, Arkansas

References

External links
 

Cemeteries on the National Register of Historic Places in Arkansas
National Register of Historic Places in Lawrence County, Arkansas
Cultural infrastructure completed in 1835
1835 establishments in Arkansas Territory
Cemeteries established in the 1830s